The Tenneva Ramblers were an old-time string band which consisted of singer and guitar player Claude Grant (April 17, 1906 - October 1975), his mandolin-playing brother Jack Grant (July 25, 1903 - March 1968), and Jack Pierce (1908 - March 1950).

Career 
The Tenneva Ramblers were formed in 1924 by founding members Jack and Claude Grant and fiddle player Jack Pierce. The band was occasionally joined by banjo player Claude Slagle (1902 - March 1950) and the blackface comedian Smoky Davis. The group met and joined up with Jimmie Rodgers in 1927 and renamed to the Jimmie Rodgers Entertainers. The group performed together on the radio station WWNC in Asheville, North Carolina on which they debuted on May 30, 1927. The group accompanied Jimmie Rodgers to Bristol, Tennessee in August 1927. Jimmie Rodgers left the group after a dispute of the band's name on August 3, 1927.

The band recorded for Victor Talking Machine Company under their original name on August 4 in the recording sessions now known as the Bristol Sessions produced by Ralph Peer. They recorded three sides that day including their most known song "The Longest Train I Ever Saw". The group went on to record another session for Victor in February, 1928 and one final session under the name "The Grant Brothers and Their Music" for Columbia Records later in 1928. The brothers continued to play music throughput the 1930's. Jack Pierce left in the 1930's and joined a band known as the Oklahoma Cowboys with whom he played on radio and recorded for Bluebird and the American Record Corporation. After a brief reunion with Pierce in the late 1940's, the group appears to have stopped performing. The group's recordings have since been released in compilations such as their song "Darling, Where Have You Been So Long? in the American Epic: The Collection compact disc set.

Discography 

American jazz ensembles
Musical groups established in 1924

References